New York, I Love You is a 2008 American romantic comedy-drama anthology film consisting of eleven short films, each by a different director. The shorts all relate in some way to the subject of love, and are set among the five boroughs of New York City. The film is a sequel of sorts to the 2006 film Paris, je t'aime, which had the same structure, and is the second installment in the Cities of Love franchise, created and produced by Emmanuel Benbihy. Unlike Paris, je t'aime, the shorts of New York, I Love You all have a unifying thread, of a videographer who films the other characters.

The film stars an ensemble cast, among them Bradley Cooper, Shia LaBeouf, Natalie Portman, Anton Yelchin, Hayden Christensen, Orlando Bloom, Irrfan Khan, Rachel Bilson, Chris Cooper, Andy García, Christina Ricci, John Hurt, Cloris Leachman, Robin Wright, Julie Christie, Maggie Q, Ethan Hawke, James Caan, Shu Qi, and Eli Wallach.

New York, I Love You premiered at the 2008 Toronto International Film Festival in September 2008, and was released in the United States on October 16, 2009. While the TIFF premiere of the film featured 14 novellas, distributors later decided to cut two of them: Scarlett Johansson's directorial debut "These Vagabond Shoes" and Andrei Zvyagintsev's novella "Apocrypha". The decision was taken after a focus screening in New York, where these two shorts were met with unfavorable reactions.

Cast and crew
Following is the cast and crew of ten segments of New York, I Love You with the transition segment directed by Randy Balsmeyer:

Release
The film grossed $1,588,087 in the United States, and $8,136,973 in other territories, for a worldwide total of $9,725,060.

Reception
On Rotten Tomatoes, the film holds a 37% approval rating based on 100 reviews, with an average rating of 5.10/10. The site's critics consensus reads: "Like many anthologies, New York, I Love You has problems of consistency, but it isn't without its moments". On Metacritic it holds a score of 49 out of 100, based on reviews from 26 critics, indicating "mixed or average reviews".

Lisa Schwarzbaum of Entertainment Weekly gave the film a B regarding the film "takes the wrinkle-free, easy-travel concept first executed in the 2007 Gallic compilation Paris, je t'aime to a new city and styles itself..." Roger Ebert of the Chicago Sun-Times gave the film 3 stars saying in his review, "By its nature, "New York, I Love You" can't add up. It remains the sum of its parts." A. O. Scott of The New York Times gave the film a mixed review claiming "Not that the 11 shorts in New York, I Love You are all that bad. It's a nice-looking city, after all, even if the interstitial skyline and traffic montages assembled by Randy Balsmeyer are about as fresh as the postcards on sale in Times Square." Lou Lumenick of the New York Post gave the film 1 star claiming "there were two additional segments that have since been cut. So you'll have to wait for the DVD to see just how bad Scarlett Johansson's directing debut is."

Erica Abeel of The Hollywood Reporter writes:  Heidi Patalano of Metro New York gives the film a 4 grade out of 5. Claudia Puig of USA Today explains that anthologies are by their very nature an uneven entity and adds:{{cquote|The multicultural emphasisboth in characters and in the unusual selection and collaboration of filmmakers and artistsis one of New York, I Love You'''s main assets. And there's no question that Manhattan looks ever-vibrant and beautiful.}}

In popular culture
An episode of the Netflix series Master of None is named and structured after New York, I Love You. Like the film, the episode follows the intersecting lives of various New Yorkers, although the episode's stories are not exclusively about romance.

The series finale of the American show Gossip Girl'' was titled "New York, I Love You XOXO" based on the film's title.

References

External links
 
 
 
 
 
 Cities of Love franchise website

2008 films
2008 romantic comedy-drama films
2000s Cantonese-language films
2000s English-language films
2000s French-language films
American anthology films
American romantic comedy-drama films
Films directed by Brett Ratner
Films directed by Fatih Akin
Films directed by the Hughes brothers
Films directed by Jiang Wen
Films directed by Joshua Marston
Films directed by Mira Nair
Films directed by Natalie Portman
Films directed by Shekhar Kapur
Films directed by Shunji Iwai
Films directed by Yvan Attal
Films scored by Atticus Ross
Films scored by Marcelo Zarvos
Films scored by Mark Mothersbaugh
Films scored by Mychael Danna
Films scored by Nicholas Britell
Films scored by Paul Cantelon
Films set in New York City
Films shot in New York City
Films with screenplays by Jeff Nathanson
Films with screenplays by Natalie Portman
2000s Gujarati-language films
Mirabai Films films
Yiddish-language films
2000s American films